Jamal Eddine Dkhissi (born in Oujda, died 24 March 2017) was a Moroccan actor. During an acting career spanning over three decades, Dkhissi participated in several works in theater and film.

Biography 
Dkhissi was born and raised in Oujda. After graduating from Abdelmoumen High School, he went on to study theater at the Academy of Dramatic Arts in Moscow. Upon returning to Morocco, he taught interpretation at the Higher Institute of Drama and Cultural Animation (ISADAC) in Rabat, training a generation of Moroccan performers. He was the ISADAC's director, and also held a tenure as the director of the national Mohamed V Theater.

Dkhissi's last public appearance was at the opening of the 18th edition of the National Film Festival of Tangier three weeks before his death, during which he received a vibrant tribute.

Death 
Dkhissi died in March 2017 at the age of 63, after a long battle with illness. He was buried at the Chouhada cemetery in Rabat. His Majesty King Mohammed VI sent a message of condolences and compassion to the late actor's family members.

Partial filmography

Feature films (as actor) 
 2013: Ymma
 2015: The Midnight Orchestra
 2015: Les loups ne dorment pas

References 

Moroccan male actors
1950s births
2017 deaths
Year of birth uncertain